This article provides two lists:
A list of National Basketball Association players by total career playoff rebounds recorded.
A progressive list of rebound leaders showing how the record has increased through the years.

Career playoff rebound leaders
This is a list of National Basketball Association players by total career playoff rebounds recorded.

Statistics accurate as of the 2022 NBA playoffs.

Progressive list of playoff rebound leaders

This is a progressive list of rebound leaders showing how the record increased through the years.

Statistics accurate as of the 2022 NBA playoffs.''

See also 
Basketball statistics
NBA post-season records

References

External links 
Basketball-Reference.com enumeration of NBA career playoff leaders in total rebounds

National Basketball Association lists
National Basketball Association statistical leaders